The report systematically considers a country's vulnerability and its exposure to natural hazards to determine a ranking of countries around the world based on their natural disaster risk. The WorldRiskIndex (WRI), developed by the Institute for Environment and Human Security (EHS) of the United Nations University (UNU) and Bündnis Entwicklung hilft (BEH), is the main feature of the WorldRiskReport (WRR). It determines the risk of becoming a victim of a disaster as a result of vulnerability and natural hazards such as earthquakes, volcanic eruptions, storms, floods, droughts and sea level rise for 172 countries worldwide. The WRI is based on 28 indicators and research data which are globally freely available and results in a global risk ranking and maps which allow for comparison between countries. Risk is at its highest where a high level of exposure to natural hazards coincides with very vulnerable societies.

Rankings

Legend

Rankings by country

See also
 Effects of climate change on humans
 Gamma-ray burst
 Emergency management
 Civil defence
 Disaster risk reduction
 Environmental disaster
 List of environmental disasters
 Environmental emergency
 List of natural disasters by death toll
 Property insurance against natural disasters
 Survivalism
 World Conference on Disaster Risk Reduction

References

External links 
  Worldwide news site focused on natural disasters, mitigation and climate changes news
 
 
 
  US news site focused on disaster-related news.
  Includes country profiles, disaster profiles and a disaster list.
  Particularly including articles on tsunamis, hurricanes and other storms.
 
 
  Provides key information on all countries in the world.
  Includes list of world's deadliest disasters in history.
 

Risk
International quality of life rankings
Natural disaster risk
Natural disaster risk